Camponotus holzi is a species of carpenter ant (genus Camponotus) found in Ecuador.

References

holzi
Hymenoptera of South America
Insects described in 1921